Dezhou braised chicken is a famous Chinese dish from the city of Dezhou in Shandong Province, China.

Introduction
Braised chicken is a traditional dish from Dezhou, and it is also known as "Dezhou Five-fragrant Boneless Braised Chicken". It was developed by the Deshunzhai (Déshùnzhāi) Restaurant in Dezhou in the era of Guangxu of the Qing Dynasty. The main procedure is as follows: Deep-fry a chicken (about one kg) until it is slightly burned. Add mushrooms, premium soy sauce, clove, amomum villosum, cardamom, angelica dahurica, fennel, and malt sugar. The finished dish is lustrous, tender, fleshy and savory. The more chewy, the more appealing. It gained popularity and became nationally known. In the past 100 years or so, this dish has been favored by domestic and international visitors.

History 
The dish is named for its origin in Dezhou, Shandong province. The full name of Dezhou braised chicken is "Dezhou five-spice bone-shed braised chicken" because the chicken is tender. It was reported by Dezhou City Annals and the Dezhou History that in 1616 the Han Chinese began to use several fragrances to stew bone chicken, which was transmitted from generation to generation. When the Qianlong Emperor (1711–1799) of the Qing dynasty traveled to Dezhou, he ordered the Han Chinese to cook braised chicken and praised it as "a miracle of all dishes". Dezhou braised chicken became the royal tribute. In 1911, Han Shigong improved traditional cooking methods and modified the cooking methods to add more ingredients. After the improvement, the chicken was more delicious. In the early 1950s, more than 20 descendants of the Han Chinese had built a partnership to produce the braised chicken. Then they opened a shop in a local train station, selling their specialty to tourists. The dish quickly became popular: travelers spread the word about the delicious chicken, and soon it gained national fame. In 1956, their descendants joined the Dezhou branch of the China Food Company. They work together to make this dish more appetizing. In 2006, the production of Dezhou braised chicken was listed as an intangible cultural heritage of Shandong Province.

Cooking method 
1. Select a hen about one kilogram.

2. Process the chicken, hollow out its belly, and place the chicken leg into the cavity.

3. Mix maltose and water. Spread evenly over the chicken. Fry in oil until chicken skin turns golden.

4. Add enough water to the pan to cover the chicken. Add chicken and spice bags, and add ginger, salt, soy sauce, etc. The spice bag consists of 16 spices, including fennel, pepper, star anise, cinnamon, cloves and so on.

5. After boiling water, turn down the heat and cook for 6–8 hours for a younger chicken, and 8–10 hours for an older chicken. Serve immediately.

See also
Shandong cuisine
Chinese cuisine

References

External links 

 Short Intro Dezhou Braised Chicken Co. Ltd.
 Soy-braised chicken ~ Yummylicious Cuisine 

Shandong cuisine
Chinese chicken dishes